Sylvanian Families is a syndicated animated series based on the Sylvanian Families merchandising franchise developed by Epoch. The series was produced in the United States by DIC Animation City with the animation being produced in Japan. It was first broadcast in 1987 in first-run syndication, with reruns on The CBN Family Channel in the late 1980s and PAX TV during the late 1990s.

Voice cast
 Frank Proctor – Woodkeeper
 Len Carlson – Packbat / Wade Waters / Cliff Babblebrook / Rocky Babblebrook
 John Stocker – Gatorpossum / Grandpa Smoky Wildwood / Gruff Timpertop / Taylor Timbertop / Chester Thistlethorn
 Michael Fantini – Preston Evergreen
 Jeri Craden – Mama Honeysuckle Evergreen
 Thick Wilson - Grandpa Ernest Evergreen
 Ellen-Ray Hennessy – Grandma Primrose Evergreen
 Noam Zylberman – Rusty Wildwood
 Catherine Gallant – Hollie Wildwood
 Jeremiah McCann – Buster Slydale
 Lisa Coristine – Scarlette Slydale
 Brian Belfry – Papa Slick Slydale
 Diane Fabian – Mama Velvette Slydale / Grandma Flora Wildwood / Mama Ginger Wildwood
 Tabitha St. Germain (credited as Paulina Gillis) – Ashley Evergreen
 Chuck Shamata – Forrest Evergreen
 Tara Strong (uncredited) – Bridget (her debut role)
 Cree Summer (uncredited) - Donny, Jessica
 Kerry Shale (uncredited) - Papa Herb Wildwood
 Marla Lukofsky (uncredited) - Jerry, Tracy, Prissy Thistlethorn, Willow

Characters

Heroes
 The Evergreens (Bears) - Forrest, Honeysuckle, Ernest, Primrose, Preston, Ashley, Dusty and Poppy
 The Babblebrooks (Rabbits) - Rocky, Crystal, Cliff, Pearl, Bubba, Breezy, Sandy and Coral
 The Thistlethorns (Mice) - Chester, Willow, Lester, Prissy, Barry and Heather
 The Chestnuts (Raccoons) - Durwood, Pansy, Grover, Myrtle, Hoss and Charity
 The Wildwoods (Rabbits) - Herb, Ginger, Smokey, Flora, Rusty, Hollie, Barkley and Juniper
 The Slydales (Foxes) - Slick, Velvette, Buster, Scarlett, Skitter and Lindy
 The Timbertops (Bears) - Taylor, Rose, Gruff, Fern, Bud, Daisy, Burl and Blossom
 The Waters (Beavers) - Wade, Nancy, Roger, Misty, Bucky and Bubbles
 The Windwards (Rabbits) Hickory and Lily
 The Sweetwaters (Bears) Morris and Kelsey

Villains
 Packbat
 Gatorpossum (Packbat's minion)
 The Slydales

Human
 The Woodkeeper

Children
Donny, Joey, Grace, Maria, Charlie, Penny, Jack, Jonathan, Katie, Bridget, Jessica, Lisa, Chrissie, Robby, Sara, Sid, Jamie, Tracy, Diane (Di), Jerry & Susan, Mikey, Lori, Andy, Debra, Evan, Amelia.

Episodes

Home media
Golden Book Video and DIC Video released three VHS tapes of the series in the United States in 1988. Two of the tapes contained three segments, while the other one contained five.

In the United Kingdom, MSD Video and Abbey Home Entertainment released many tapes of the series throughout the 80's and 90's. One of the tapes was known as Sylvanian Families: The Movie, which despite the name, just featured segments edited together to form a movie.

In February 2004, Sterling Entertainment released two VHS/DVD's, titled The Big Adventure and Hoppily Ever After, each containing 3 episodes (6 segments). An extra segment was included on the DVD versions. The first segment from episode 3: "The Bear Facts" was also included on the Care Bears: To The Rescue DVD from the same company a year prior. The Big Adventure was reissued by NCircle Entertainment in 2008.

In May 2004, Maximum Entertainment released a DVD in the United Kingdom that contained the first 5 episodes of the series. This DVD was reissued in 2007, and again in 2009 by Lace DVD.

In Australia in 2010, Magna Home Entertainment released a 2-disc set containing all 13 episodes of the series.

References

External links
 

1980s American animated television series
1987 American television series debuts
1987 American television series endings
1980s French animated television series
1987 French television series debuts
1987 French television series endings
American children's animated fantasy television series
Australian Broadcasting Corporation original programming
French children's animated fantasy television series
Japanese children's animated fantasy television series
English-language television shows
Television series by DIC Entertainment
Television shows based on toys
Animated television series about bears
Animated television series about families
Animated television series about rabbits and hares
Animated television series about mice and rats
Television series by Sony Pictures Television